Villadoz is a municipality located in the province of Zaragoza, Aragon, Spain. According to the 2020 census, the municipality has a population of 95 inhabitants.

The town is located close to the Sierra del Peco mountain range.

History
Romans archaeological remains dated in the 2nd century B.C. have been found inside the municipal limit: remains of lime near of the river Huerva that they seem to be the base of a Roman bridge, Roman villas in the zone known as "Fuente del Manco" (Source of the Shortage) and part of the Roman causeway that was joining "Caecesaraugusta" (Zaragoza) with Saguntum (Sagunto) and Valentia (Valencia) near the Roman villas. Also they have found numerous objects of Roman ceramics in fields of culture of the zone of "Fuente del Manco".

In the year 1248, for privilege of Jaime I of Aragon, this place comes undone of Daroca's dependence, happening to form a part of "Sesma de Langa" in the Community of Daroca's Villages, which were depending directly on the king, lasting this administrative regime up to the death of Fernando VII of Spain in 1833, being disuelta already in 1838. The parochial church of Mudejar Aragonese art dedicated to Santiago Apostle was built in first years, also in this time was built  the hermitages dedicated to Saint Bartholome are built (demolished) and to Mary Magdalene (in ruins).

In the middle of the 19th century there were destroyed the hermitages of Saint Bartholome and of Mary Magdalene. There is constructed a hermitage dedicated to the new patron saint of the village: Saint Martin of Tours. In 1845 the Villarroya del Campo village is declared  neighborhood of Villadoz. The neighborhood became free at the end of the same century.

In 1933 the industry came to Villadoz, thanks to the railway network Zaragoza - Caminreal administered by the company "Ways of Iron of the North". To half of the above-mentioned century there were unified the railway Spanish companies and it happened to form a part of Renfe, in addition the line extended up to Teruel. At the end of the decade of 1990 the line extended for both ends towards Valencia and Huesca. On the Spanish Civil war there exists information of which there was an attempt on the railroad, which there were a few executions in the railway bridge of five republicans of Santa Cruz de Noguera. Also four Falangists of the village were killed.

The 21st century is a time of modernization, in the year 2006 was reformed the tower múdejar of the parochial church of Santiago Apostle and the peiron of the Virgin of Carmen. In the year 2008 there was created the A-23 (Mudejar Highway), there was constructed the new railway alighting-place and the municipal park.

Festivities
November 11th: San Martín (village's pattern, in saturday night a bonfire is held in the main square where a roast dinner is prepared and then is held a festival).
Previous Sunday to Corpus Christi: Trinidad (Pilgrimage to a near village church).
July 25th: Santiago Apóstol (Main festival of the village with many different activities).

Places of interest
Hermitage of San Martín (late romanesque art ruins), Hermitage of María Magdalena (chapel), Parish Church of Santiago Apóstol (Mudejar art tower and Gothic art altarpiece dated in the 15th century), and Peirón of the Virgen del Carmen (Mudejar art column, typical monument of this region).

Also there are a peaceful natural area next to the river Huerva, formed by a riverside forest called in spanish "soto". It's a relaxing place with a picnic area where rest for a while and where the caravans can be park, always respecting the natural environment.

Transports and communications
Villadoz has a railway alighting-place, which is a stop of the line 49 of Renfe Media Distancia (Huesca - Zaragoza - Teruel - Valencia)

These are the roads that cross the municipal limit: 
A-23 (motorway) [French Border - Huesca - Zaragoza - Villadoz - Teruel - Sagunto (Province of Valencia)]
CV-642 (Villadoz - A-23 - Villarreal de Huerva) 
A-2509 (Mainar - Villadoz - Badules)

See also
Campo de Daroca
List of municipalities in Zaragoza

References

External links

Villadoz - Tourism

Municipalities in the Province of Zaragoza